The octagonal bipyramid is one of the infinite set of bipyramids, dual to the infinite prisms. If an octagonal bipyramid is to be face-transitive, all faces must be isosceles triangles. 16-sided dice are often octagonal bipyramids.

Images 
It can be drawn as a tiling on a sphere which also represents the fundamental domains of [4,2], *422 symmetry:

Related polyhedra

External links
 
Virtual Reality Polyhedra The Encyclopedia of Polyhedra
 VRML models <8>
Conway Notation for Polyhedra Try: dP8

Polyhedra